Melaleuca fulgens subsp. fulgens, commonly known as the scarlet honey myrtle, is a plant in the myrtle family, Myrtaceae and is endemic to the south-west of Western Australia. In 1990, the species Melaleuca fulgens was separated into 3 subspecies and this is the most widespread of them. As with the other two subspecies, this one is notable for its showy flowers which are usually red but its foliage and fruits are also attractive features.

Description
Its leaves are arranged in alternating pairs at right angles to those immediately above and below (decussate) so that the leaves are in four rows along the stems.
     
The flowers are usually bright red, but sometimes other shades of red, pink or white and are arranged in spikes on the sides of the branches. Each spike contains 6 to 20 individual flowers arranged in a decussate pattern. The stamens are arranged in five bundles around the flower, each bundle containing 22 to 80 stamens. The stamen filaments are long. The flowers appear from June to April but mostly in September and October. The fruits which follow are woody capsules  in diameter, shaped like a squashed urn and arranged in alternating pairs along the stems.

Taxonomy and naming
Melaleuca fulgens was first formally described by the botanist Robert Brown in William Aiton's Hortus Kewensis in 1812. In 1990, the species was separated into three subspecies by Kirsten Cowley, Frances Quinn, Bryan Barlow and Lyndley Craven in Australian Systematic Botany. The specific epithet "is from the Latin fulgens, shining, bright-coloured, in reference to the bright red flowers".

Distribution and habitat
Melaleuca fulgens subsp. fulgens occurs in and between the Paynes Find, Great Victoria Desert and Israelite Bay districts in the Avon Wheatbelt, Coolgardie, Esperance Plains, Geraldton Sandplains, Great Victoria Desert, Mallee, Murchison and Yalgoo biogeographic regions. It grows in sand, loam or gravel, on granite outcrops.

Use in horticulture
This subspecies of Melaleuca fulgens is commonly grown in Australian gardens but requires full sun and excellent drainage for best results.

References

fulgens subsp. fulgens
Flora of Western Australia
Myrtales of Australia
Plants described in 1812
Plant subspecies